The Gainesville City School District is a public school district in Hall County, Georgia, United States, based in Gainesville. It serves most of the city of Gainesville, along with a few unincorporated areas of Hall County.

Schools
The Gainesville City School District has five elementary schools, two middle schools, and one high school.

Elementary schools
Centennial Arts Academy
Enota MI Academy
Fair Street International Academy
Gainesville Exploration Academy
New Holland Knowledge Academy
Mundy Mill Elementary

Middle school
Gainesville Middle School East
Gainesville Middle School West

High school
Gainesville High School

Private school
Wood's Mill Academy

References

External links

School districts in Georgia (U.S. state)
Gainesville, Georgia
Education in Hall County, Georgia